Papyrus 87 (in the Gregory-Aland numbering), designated by 𝔓87, is an early New Testament papyrus. It is the earliest known manuscript of the Epistle to Philemon. The surviving texts of Philemon are verses 13–15, 24–25.

The manuscript paleographically has been assigned to the early 3rd century (or late 2nd century).

The Greek text of this codex is a representative of the Alexandrian text-type (or proto-Alexandrian). Aland ascribed it as "Normal text", and placed it in Category I.

It is currently housed at the University of Cologne (P. Col. theol. 12) in Cologne.

See also 

 List of New Testament papyri

References

Further reading 

 C. Römer, Kölner Papyri 4, Papyrologica Colonensia 7 (Cologne: 1984), pp. 28–31.
 K. Wachtel, K. Witte, Das Neue Testament auf Papyrus II, Die Paulinischen Briefe, Teil II, Berlin 1994, S. LXIII-IV, P. 87.

External links 
 at the Kölner Papyrus-sammlung
 GA Papyrus 87. Center for the Study of New Testament Manuscripts

New Testament papyri
3rd-century biblical manuscripts
Early Greek manuscripts of the New Testament
Epistle to Philemon papyri